Duncan MacFarlane (15 January 1827 – 3 May 1903) was a New Zealand grocer, merchant, government agent, farmer and magistrate.

He was born in Dumbarton, Dunbartonshire, Scotland on 15 January 1827. He married Christina Thomson in 1858. His eldest daughter married Joseph Grimmond in May 1898.

He died in Hokitika in 1903.

References

1827 births
1903 deaths
New Zealand farmers
District Court of New Zealand judges
People from Dumbarton
New Zealand traders
Scottish emigrants to New Zealand
Colony of New Zealand judges
Burials at Hokitika Cemetery